Noordwijkerhout is a town and former municipality in the western part of the Netherlands, in the province of South Holland. The town is currently part of the municipality of Noordwijk and lies in the bulb-growing region (the Duin- en Bollenstreek) of the Netherlands, which is famed for its tulips.

It also included the village of De Zilk, which together with the town of Noordwijkerhout became part of the municipality of Noordwijk on 1 January 2019.

History
The coastal dunes where Noordwijkerhout is located have been inhabited since prehistoric times. Archaeological digs in the area just north outside of town have found items and implements from before Christ. During the Roman era, this region was inhabited by a Germanic tribe, called Cananefates by the Roman writer Tacitus.

Recreation and tourism
Noordwijkerhout is about 5 kilometers from the North Sea and provides access to the beach and nearby hiking opportunities through the dunes. Just north of town is the Oosterduinse meer (Eastern Dune's Lake) which is used for swimming and windsurfing. The center is also historical and have a church Witte kerkje.

Noordwijkerhout is located in an area called the "Dune and Bulb Region" (Duin- en Bollenstreek). In the spring when the bulb flower fields are in bloom, many tourist come to the region to admire them. The town's fair is held during the first week of September.

Dutch topographic map of the municipality of Noordwijkerhout, June 2015

Notable residents
Bill Vander Zalm, 28th Premier of British Columbia, Canada

International relations

Twin towns – Sister cities
Noordwijkerhout has one sister city in Japan
 Hirado, Nagasaki, Japan (Sister city)

References

External links

Official website

Noordwijk
Former municipalities of South Holland
Populated places in South Holland
Municipalities of the Netherlands disestablished in 2019